In Montana, an at-large congressional district special election was held on May 25, 2017, to determine the member of the United States House of Representatives for Montana's at-large congressional district.  The election was necessitated by incumbent Republican Representative Ryan Zinke's appointment as United States Secretary of the Interior. Zinke resigned on March 1, 2017, upon his confirmation.

Montana's state law required the Governor of Montana to call for a special election to be held no less than 85 and no more than 100 days after the vacancy. Governor Steve Bullock declared a special election to take place on May 25, the earliest possible day he was legally allowed to choose.

The Democratic, Republican, Libertarian, and Green Parties held nominating conventions to decide their nominee. The day before the election, Gianforte assaulted a reporter and was charged with misdemeanor assault. At around 10:30pm MST, the election was called for Gianforte after 77% of the votes were counted.

Republican Party
The Republican Party nominated a candidate at a convention on March 6.

Nominated
Greg Gianforte, founder of RightNow Technologies and nominee for governor in 2016

Eliminated at convention
Edward Buttrey, state senator
Carl Glimm, state representative
Ken Miller, former state senator, former chair of the Montana Republican Party and candidate for governor in 2012
Samuel Redfern, nonprofit executive
Dean Rehbein, contractor
Ed Walker, former state senator

Withdrawn
Eugene Graf, businessman
Drew Turiano, real estate agent and perennial candidate

Declined
Gary Carlson, publisher of The White Hat Express
Russell Fagg, Yellowstone County District Judge
Matthew Rosendale, state auditor and candidate for this seat in 2014
Scott Sales, president of the State Senate
Richard B. Spencer, president of the National Policy Institute
Daniel Zolnikov, state representative

Results

Democratic Party
The Democratic Party selected a nominee at a convention on March 5.

The Bozeman Daily Chronicle from February 4 to 8 conducted a straw poll of Democratic delegates. Of 89 delegates that responded, Rob Quist was selected by 37, Amanda Curtis by 30, Kelly McCarthy by 13, 9 were undecided, and zero delegates selected John Meyer or other.

Nominated
Rob Quist, musician, former spokesman and advocate for the Montana Food Bank, and former member of the Montana Arts Council

Eliminated at convention
Amanda Curtis, state representative and nominee for the U.S. Senate in 2014
Kelly McCarthy, state representative
John Meyer, attorney and executive director of the Cottonwood Environmental Law Center
Lee "Link" Neimark, ski instructor and small business owner
Gary Stein, teacher and candidate for the state house in 2008
Thomas Weida, retired businessman
Dan West, former aide to Senators Max Baucus and Mark Udall and former appointee to NASA

Declined
Zeno Baucus, Assistant U.S. Attorney and son of former U.S. Senator Max Baucus
Larry Jent, former state senator
Denise Juneau, former superintendent of public instruction and candidate for this seat in 2016
Casey Schreiner, state representative

Endorsements (primary)

Results

Libertarian Party
The Libertarian Party Convention on March 11, 2017, was held at Eagle's Lodge in Helena, Montana.

The following county affiliate parties were represented at the convention:
Gallatin County
Flathead County
Park County
Missoula County
Ravalli County
Lake County
Yellowstone County
Broadwater County
Lewis and Clark County
Hill County

Officers of the Montana Libertarian Party and delegates from the assembled counties had voting rights.

Nominated
 Mark Wicks, author, rancher and fruit salesman

Eliminated at convention
Joe Paschal, rancher and businessman
Chris Colvin, retired masonry contractor and writer
Evan Gardner, small business owner
Dan Nelson, IT administrator
Rufus Peace, accounting analyst
Nathan McKenty
James White, Uber driver

Withdrawn
Rick Breckenridge, land surveyor

Results

Green Party
The Green Party Convention on March 4, 2017, was held at the University of Montana's Payne Family Native American Center.

Breck, along with two independent candidates, won a lawsuit in U.S. District Court against the Montana Secretary of State, ruling Montana's ballot access laws to be unconstitutional in the case of special elections. The District Court Judge ruled to change the original requirement to submit 14,268 ballot petition signatures, reducing that requirement to 400 signatures. The US Court decision failed to provide further remedy and Breck's name was not placed on the ballot despite injunctive appeals to the Ninth Circuit Court and U.S. Supreme Court. Breck subsequently endorsed Independent write-in candidate Doug Campbell who was a co-plaintiff in the suit.

Nominated
Thomas Breck

General election

Campaign 
During his 2017 Congressional special election campaign, Gianforte relaxed his past pledges to refuse all PAC money, and began to turn away only corporate PAC funding. His campaign began accepting contributions from political party and leadership PACs.

The night before the election, Gianforte physically assaulted Ben Jacobs, a reporter from The Guardian, in front of multiple witnesses, knocking him down, punching him, and breaking his glasses.  Gianforte was subsequently charged with misdemeanor assault. The editorial boards of the Billings Gazette, the Independent Record, and the Missoulian rescinded their endorsements of Gianforte.

The Gianforte campaign released a statement following the incident alleging the incident was caused by, "this aggressive behavior from a liberal journalist", a claim contradictory to the eyewitness account of the Fox News team present in the room at the time. Alicia Acuna, one of two Fox news reporters present, and the only eyewitnesses to the incident, stated that Jacobs had walked into the room, put a voice recorder up to Gianforte's face and began asking questions. She stated that Jacobs, however, showed no sign of physical aggression and did not physically engage Gianforte before being attacked by the Republican candidate.

On June 12, following the election, Gianforte was sentenced to community service and fined $385 after admitting the charge.

Predictions

Endorsements

Polling
{| class="wikitable"
|- valign= bottom
! style="width:200px;"| Poll source
! style="width:160px;"| Date(s)administered
! class=small | Samplesize
! Margin oferror
! style="width:100px;"| GregGianforte (R)
! style="width:100px;"| RobQuist (D)
! style="width:100px;"| MarkWicks (L)
! styke="width:100px;"| ThomasBreck (G)
! Undecided
|-
| Change Research
| align=center| May 20–23, 2017
| align=center| 1,888
| align=center| ± 2.0%
|  align=center| 49%
| align=center| 44%
| align=center| 7%
| align=center| –
| align=center| –
|-
| Gravis Marketing
| align=center| May 22, 2017
| align=center| 818
| align=center| ± 3.4%
|  align=center| 49%
| align=center| 35%
| align=center| 8%
| align=center| –
| align=center| 9%
|-
| Gravis Marketing
| align=center| May 2–4, 2017
| align=center| 462
| align=center| ± 4.6%
|  align=center| 45%
| align=center| 37%
| align=center| 5%
| align=center| 3%
| align=center| 10%
|-
| Gravis Marketing
| align=center| April 27, 2017
| align=center| 836
| align=center| ± 3.4%
|  align=center| 52%
| align=center| 39%
| align=center| 6%
| align=center| –
| align=center| 2%
|-
| Garin-Hart-Yang (D)
| align=center| April 25–27, 2017
| align=center| 601
| align=center| ± 4.0%
|  align=center| 49%
| align=center| 43%
| align=center| –
| align=center| –
| align=center| 8%
|-
| Emerson College
| align=center| April 20–21, 2017
| align=center| 648
| align=center| ± 3.8%
|  align=center| 52%
| align=center| 37%
| align=center| 5%
| align=center| –
| align=center| 7%
|-
| Gravis Marketing
| align=center| April 6, 2017
| align=center| 1,222
| align=center| ± 2.9%
|  align=center| 50%
| align=center| 38%
| align=center| 3%
| align=center| 2%
| align=center| 7%

Results

County results

See also 
 List of special elections to the United States House of Representatives
 United States House of Representatives election in Montana, 2016

References

External links

Official campaign websites
 Greg Gianforte (R) for Congress
 Rob Quist (D) for Congress
 Mark Wicks (L) for Congress

May 2017 events in the United States
Montana 2017 at-large
Montana 2017 at-large
2017 at-large Special
Montana at-large Special
United States House of Representatives at-large Special
United States House of Representatives 2017 at-large